Ater James "AJ" Majok (born 4 July 1987) is a professional basketball player for Petro de Luanda. He was drafted by the Los Angeles Lakers in the 2011 NBA draft with the 58th overall pick. Born in Sudan and raised in Australia, Majok represents Lebanon internationally.

High school and college career
Majok was born in Sudan in 1987. He migrated to Sydney through a refugee camp in Egypt. Upon arrival in Sydney, he bonded with a group of young men also from Sudan, called the South Stars basketball team.

He attended high school at St Aloysius' College and Parramatta Marist High School in Sydney, and the American International School in Carlingford where he graduated in 2008.

After graduating, Majok committed to the University of Connecticut. He sat out during the 2008–09 season because he was not cleared to play by the NCAA. In January 2009, Majok joined the UConn roster and was eligible to practice with the squad for the remainder of the season, but was not able to play in games. In April 2009, he declared for the 2009 NBA draft but did not sign with an agent. About a week before the draft, he decided to withdraw his name and returned to UConn.

On 20 December 2009, Majok made his debut with the Huskies. He scored one point and collected three rebounds in 16 minutes of action as a starter.

In September 2010, Majok announced that he was leaving Connecticut, though the reasons as to why remain unclear. In 2009–10, he played in 26 games for the Huskies, averaging 2.3 points, 3.0 rebounds and 1.6 blocks per game.

Professional career

2010–11 season
In October 2010, Majok signed a two-month deal with FMV Isikspor Istanbul, a 2nd-division Turkish club. He played 7 games for them, averaging 13.9 points, 8.6 rebounds and 3.1 blocks in 28.3 minutes. After his contract expired, he left Turkey.
 
On 24 December 2010, Majok signed a six-week deal with the Perth Wildcats of the Australian NBL as an injury replacement for Jesse Wagstaff and Matthew Knight. In 8 games for the Wildcats, Majok averaged 7.5 points, 2.8 rebounds and 2.0 blocks per game. Despite his short stint in Perth, Majok became a favourite amongst the Wildcats fans with due to his shot blocking ability, blocking a total of 11 shots in his first three games.

On 12 February 2011, Majok signed with the Gold Coast Blaze for the rest of the 2010–11 season as an injury replacement for Mark Worthington. On 22 March 2011, just days before the Gold Coast's final home game of the 2010–11 NBL season against the Adelaide 36ers, Majok was released by the club so that he could advance his preparations and seek out training-camp opportunities in the United States prior to the 2011 NBA draft. In 6 games for the Blaze, he averaged 2.8 points and 2.3 rebounds per game.

2011–12 season
On 23 June 2011, Majok was selected by the Los Angeles Lakers with the 58th overall pick in the 2011 NBA draft. In August 2011, he signed with BK SPU Nitra of Slovakia for the 2011–12 season. In 41 league games for Nitra, he averaged 11.2 points, 8.1 rebounds, 2.6 blocks and 1.4 assists per game.

2012–13 season
Majok joined the Los Angeles Lakers for the 2012 NBA Summer League. In 3 games (1 start), he averaged 1.7 points, 4.3 rebounds and 1.3 blocks in 15 minutes per game.

In September 2012, he signed a short-term deal with Maccabi Tel Aviv of Israel but left a month later before appearing in a game for them. In November 2012, he signed with BC Tsmoki-Minsk for the rest of the 2012–13 season. In 13 VTB United League games for Tsmoki-Minsk, he averaged 4.2 points, 4.2 rebounds and 1.1 blocks per game.

2013–14 season
On 3 September 2013, Majok signed with KCC Egis of Korea for the 2013–14 season. On 29 October 2013, he was released by Egis after just 12 games. The next day, he signed with Taiwan Beer for the rest of the season. On 12 November 2013, he was released by Taiwan Beer before appearing in a game for them.

On 30 December 2013, he signed with BG Göttingen of Germany for the rest of the season. In 23 games for Göttingen, he averaged 4.3 points and 3.3 rebounds per game.

2014–15 season
On 12 December 2014, Majok was acquired by the Los Angeles D-Fenders of the NBA Development League. On 25 February, he was waived by the D-Fenders after suffering a season-ending MCL sprain to his left knee.

2015–16 season
On 1 September 2015, Majok signed with Trefl Sopot of the Polish Basketball League. In 27 games for Trefl, he averaged 9.8 points, 7.0 rebounds and 1.8 blocks per game.

In May 2016, Majok joined Beijing Eastern Bucks of the Chinese National Basketball League.

2016–17 season
On 21 October 2016, he signed with Homenetmen Beirut of the Lebanese Basketball League. In 2017, he received the Lebanese citizenship and represented Lebanon in the 2017 West Asian Championship. 

In June 2017, he signed with the Luoyang Zhonghe of the Chinese National Basketball League. In his first game with Luoyang, Majok recorded 24 points, 20 rebounds and 7 blocks in a 123-138 loss to Anhui Wenyi.

2017–18 season
In October 2017, Majok signed with Sagesse Club of the Lebanese Basketball League. In June 2018, Majok signed with Shaanxi Xinda of the Chinese National Basketball League.

2018–19 season
Majok signed with Champville SC in Lebanon on August 16, 2018.

2019–20 season
On 6 August 2019, Majok signed with the New Zealand Breakers for the 2019–20 NBL season.

2020–21 season
On 20 August 2020, Majok signed with Al-Arabi of the Qatari Basketball League.

In February 2020, Majok signed with US Monastir for the 2020 BAL season. The BAL season was however cancelled due to the COVID-19 pandemic. Nevertheless, Majok was on the roster for the 2021 season.

2021–22 season
On August 30, 2021, Majok signed with Beirut Club of the Lebanese Basketball League.

In October 2021, Majok returned to Tunisia when he signed with Ezzahra Sports.

On March 2, 2022, Majok was announced to be on the roster of US Monastir for the 2022 BAL season, his second stint with the team and his second appearance in the BAL. He played as an African import due to his South Sudanese heritage. Majok and Monastir won the 2022 BAL Finals and captured the club's first African title. He was named the Defensive Player of the Year and was given a place in the league's All-First Team and All-Defensive Team as well.

In June 2022, Majok joined the Piratas de La Guaira of the Venezuelan SuperLiga.

2022–23 season 
In March 2023, Majok signed with Petro de Luanda.

NBA draft rights
On 7 July 2016, Majok's draft rights were acquired by the Chicago Bulls in exchange for José Calderón and two future second-round draft picks. 

On 1 September 2017, Majok's draft rights were traded to the New Orleans Pelicans in exchange for the Chicago Bulls receiving Quincy Pondexter, a 2018 second round pick, and cash considerations. Majok's right was renounced by the Pelicans on 13 September.

BAL career statistics

|-
|style="text-align:left;"|2021
|style="text-align:left;"|Monastir
| 6 || 6 || 24.7 || .462 || .143 || .812 || 6.7 || 1.0 || .5 || 2.0 || 8.3
|-
| style="text-align:left;background:#afe6ba;"|2022†
|style="text-align:left;"|Monastir
| 8 || 8 || 31.4 || .613 || .333 || .577 || 11.0 || 1.9 || .5 || 2.4 || 13.6
|- class="sortbottom"

National team career
Majok plays internationally for the Lebanon national basketball team. He helped his country win gold at the 2022 Arab Basketball Championship in Dubai.

Personal life
Majok is the son of James Majok and Amer Jacob, and has three brothers, Kashual, Orokey and Jacob and two sisters, Agum and Awod. Majok's cousin, Majok Majok, played college basketball for two seasons at Midland College in the National Junior College Athletic Association (NJCAA) before transferring to Ball State University (NCAA) for his junior season. He holds Lebanese and Australian passports.

Awards and accomplishments

Club
US Monastir
 Basketball Africa League: (2022)
 2× Championnat National A: (2020, 2021)
Shaanxi Xinda
 Chinese NBL: (2018)
Homenetmen Beirut
 Henri Chalhoub Tournament champion: (2017)
BG Göttingen
 ProA: (2014)
Tsmoki-Minsk
 Belarusian Premier League: (2013)
 Belarusian Cup: (2013)
SPU Nitra
 Slovakia Cup: (2012)

International
Lebanon
Arab Basketball Championship  gold medal: (2022)

Individual
 BAL Defensive Player of the Year: (2022)
 All-BAL First Team: (2022)
 BAL All-Defensive Team: (2022)
 Championnat National A Best Foreign Player: (2020)
 3× Chinese NBL Defensive Player of the Year: (2016, 2018, 2019)

References

External links
UConn bio 

1987 births
Living people
Australian men's basketball players
Australian expatriate basketball people in Germany
Australian expatriate basketball people in the United States
Australian expatriate basketball people in Poland
Australian expatriate basketball people in Turkey
Australian people of South Sudanese descent
Sportspeople of South Sudanese descent
Basketball players from Sydney
BC Tsmoki-Minsk players
BG Göttingen players
Beirut Club players
Centers (basketball)
Lebanese expatriate basketball people in Turkey
Gold Coast Blaze players
Lebanese men's basketball players
Lebanese expatriate basketball people in the United States
Los Angeles D-Fenders players
Los Angeles Lakers draft picks
Ezzahra Sports players
New Zealand Breakers players
People educated at St Aloysius' College (Sydney)
People from Khartoum
Perth Wildcats players
Power forwards (basketball)
Trefl Sopot players
UConn Huskies men's basketball players
US Monastir basketball players
Sagesse SC basketball players
South Sudanese men's basketball players
Al Riyadi Club Beirut basketball players
Sudanese people of South Sudanese descent
People with acquired Lebanese citizenship
South Sudanese refugees
Refugees in Egypt
Sudanese emigrants to Australia
Australian expatriate basketball people in China
Australian expatriate basketball people in Bahrain
Australian expatriate basketball people in Venezuela
Australian expatriate basketball people in Tunisia
Australian expatriate basketball people in Qatar
Australian expatriate basketball people in New Zealand
Australian expatriate basketball people in Slovakia
Australian expatriate basketball people in Belarus
Australian expatriate basketball people in South Korea
Lebanese expatriate basketball people in China
Lebanese expatriate basketball people in Venezuela
Lebanese expatriate basketball people in South Korea
Lebanese expatriate basketball people in New Zealand
Lebanese expatriate basketball people in Slovakia
Lebanese expatriate basketball people in Poland
Lebanese expatriate basketball people in Qatar
Lebanese expatriate basketball people in Belarus
Lebanese expatriate basketball people in Bahrain
Lebanese expatriate basketball people in Tunisia
Lebanese expatriate basketball people in Germany